Sebastiania larensis is a species of flowering plant in the family Euphorbiaceae. It was described in 1949. It is native to northwestern Venezuela.

References

Plants described in 1949
Flora of Venezuela
larensis
Taxa named by Léon Croizat